Konye is a town and commune in Cameroon located along the Kumba - Mamfe road in the Southwest Region.

Localities 
 Kurume, Cameroon

References

Communes of Southwest Region (Cameroon)